This is a list of the UNESCO World Heritage Sites around the world by year of inscription, selected during the annual sessions of the World Heritage Committee. The first World Heritage Site in the list is the Galápagos Islands. The 24th session in 2000 inscribed the most with 61 entries, while the 13th session in 1989 only inscribed seven sites.

(F) denotes a country's first inscription.

1978 (2nd session)
12 sites (8 cultural, 4 natural)Host:

1979 (3rd session)
45 sites (34 cultural, 8 natural, 3 mixed)Host:

1980 (4th session)
27 sites (22 cultural, 5 natural)Host:

1981 (5th session)
26 sites (15 cultural, 9 natural, 2 mixed)Host:

1982 (6th session)
24 sites (17 cultural, 5 natural, 2 mixed)Host:

1983 (7th session)
29 sites (19 cultural, 9 natural, 1 mixed)Host:

1984 (8th session)
22 sites (15 cultural, 7 natural)Host:

1985 (9th session)
30 sites (25 cultural, 4 natural, 1 mixed)Host:

1986 (10th session)
29 sites (23 cultural, 5 natural, 1 mixed)Host:

1987 (11th session)
41 sites (32 cultural, 7 natural, 2 mixed)Host:

1988 (12th session)
27 sites (19 cultural, 5 natural, 3 mixed)Host:

1989 (13th session)
7 sites (4 cultural, 2 natural, 1 mixed)Host:

1990 (14th session)
16 sites (11 cultural, 2 natural, 3 mixed)Host:

1991 (15th session)
22 sites (16 cultural, 6 natural)Host:

1992 (16th session)
20 sites (16 cultural, 4 natural)Host:

1993 (17th session)
33 sites (29 cultural, 4 natural)Host:

1994 (18th session)
29 sites (21 cultural, 8 natural)Host:

1995 (19th session)
29 sites (23 cultural, 6 natural)Host:

1996 (20th session)
37 sites (30 cultural, 5 natural, 2 mixed)Host:

1997 (21st session)
46 sites (38 cultural, 7 natural, 1 mixed)Host:

1998 (22nd session)
30 sites (27 cultural, 3 natural)Host:

1999 (23rd session)
48 sites (35 cultural, 11 natural, 2 mixed)Host:

2000 (24th session)
61 sites (50 cultural, 10 natural, 1 mixed)Host:

2001 (25th session)
31 sites (25 cultural, 6 natural)Host:

2002 (26th session)
9 sites (8 cultural, 1 mixed)Host:

2003 (27th session)
24 sites (19 cultural, 5 natural)Host:

2004 (28th session)
34 sites (29 cultural, 5 natural)Host:

2005 (29th session)
24 sites (17 cultural, 7 natural)Host:

2006 (30th session)
18 sites (16 cultural, 2 natural)Host:

2007 (31st session)
22 sites (16 cultural, 4 natural, 2 mixed)Host:

2008 (32nd session)
27 sites (19 cultural, 8 natural)Host:

2009 (33rd session)
13 sites (11 cultural, 2 natural)Host:

2010 (34th session)
21 sites (15 cultural, 5 natural, 1 mixed)Host:

2011 (35th session)
25 sites (21 cultural, 3 natural, 1 mixed)Host:

2012 (36th session)
26 sites (20 cultural, 5 natural, 1 mixed)Host:

2013 (37th session)
19 sites (14 cultural, 5 natural)Host:

2014 (38th session)
26 sites (22 cultural, 3 natural, 1 mixed)Host:

2015 (39th session)
24 sites (23 cultural, 1 mixed)Host:

2016 (40th session)
21 sites (12 cultural, 6 natural, 3 mixed)Host:

2017 (41st session)
21 sites (18 cultural, 3 natural)Host:

2018 (42nd session)
19 sites (13 cultural, 3 natural, 3 mixed)Host:

2019 (43rd session)
29 sites (24 cultural, 4 natural, 1 mixed)Host:

2021 (44th session)
The 44th session was originally scheduled for 2020 but postponed to 2021 due to the COVID-19 pandemic. Thus, the World Heritage Committee voted on both 2020 and 2021 nominations.

34 sites (29 cultural, 5 natural)Host:

2023 (18th extraordinary session)
At its 18th extraordinary session, the World Heritage Committee added three sites under an emergency procedure to both the World Heritage List and the List of World Heritage in Danger.

3 sites (3 cultural)Host:

2023 (45th session)
The 45th session was originally scheduled to be held from 19 June to 30 June, 2022, in Kazan, Russia, but was postponed indefinitely due to the Russian invasion of Ukraine. The World Heritage Committee then rescheduled the 45th session to 10-25 September 2023 in Riyadh, Saudi Arabia, and will vote on 2022 and 2023 nominations.

See also
 Former UNESCO World Heritage Sites
 List of World Heritage in Danger
 Lists of World Heritage Sites
 World Heritage Sites by country

References

External links
 UNESCO World Heritage portal – Official website (in English and French)
 The World Heritage List – Official searchable list of all Inscribed Properties
 New Inscribed Properties – List of new Inscribed Properties. Also lists nominated sites prior to an upcoming session of the World Heritage Committee.

World Heritage Sites
 
World Heritage Sites